Xuxa só para Baixinhos 4 - Praia (also known as XSPB 4) is the twenty-sixth studio album and the nineteenth in Portuguese by singer and Brazilian presenter Xuxa, released by Som Livre on July 25, 2003. It is the fourth album in the collection Só Para Baixinhos.

Release and reception
Xuxa only for Baixinhos 4 - Praia, was released on July 25, 2003, first in the CD and VHS version and released on DVD on November 26, 2003, it was remastered and released on CD in 2008 in an economic version. The singles were "Estátua", "Hula Hula da Xuxinha", "Taba Naba" and "Dedo das Mãos, Dedo dos Pés". This album reached the 3rd position among the best sold in Brazil in 2003, and 18th in the list of best selling DVDs in Brazil in 2003, according to the Associação Brasileira de Produtores de Discos (ABPD).

Track listing

Personnel
General and Artistic Direction: Xuxa Meneghel
Executive production: Luiz Cláudio Moreira and Mônica Muniz
Musical production: Ary Sperling
Musical Coordination: Vanessa Alves (Vavá)
Recording Engineers: Val Andrade (Valvulado)
Mixing Engineers: Guilherme Reis
Version: Vanessa Alves (Vavá)
Production: Xuxa Produções and Som Livre
Direction: Blad Meneghel
Director of photography: Luiz Leal (Luizinho)
Production director: Junior Porto
Production Coordination: Ana Paula Guimarães (Catu)
Production assistant: Andrezza Cruz
Cameraman: Osvaldo Rogério (Gaúcho)

References

External links 
 Xuxa só para Baixinhos 4 at Discogs

2003 albums
2003 video albums
Xuxa albums
Xuxa video albums
Children's music albums by Brazilian artists
Portuguese-language video albums
Portuguese-language albums
Som Livre albums